This list is of the Cultural Properties of Japan designated in the category of  for the Prefecture of Gunma.

National Cultural Properties
As of 1 May 2015, five Important Cultural Properties have been designated, being of national significance.

Prefectural Cultural Properties
As of 24 March 2015, thirty-seven properties have been designated at a prefectural level.

See also
 Cultural Properties of Japan
 List of National Treasures of Japan (paintings)
 Japanese painting
 List of Cultural Properties of Japan - historical materials (Gunma)

References

External links
  Cultural Properties in Gunma Prefecture

Cultural Properties,Gunma
Cultural Properties,Paintings
Paintings,Gunma
Lists of paintings